
Gmina Postomino is a rural gmina (administrative district) in Sławno County, West Pomeranian Voivodeship, in northwestern Poland.

Villages
Gmina Postomino contains the villages and settlements of Bylica, Chełmno Słowieńskie, Chudaczewko, Chudaczewo, Czarna Buda, Dołek, Dzierżęcin, Górka, Górsko, Jarosławiec, Jezierzany, Kanin, Karsino, Kłośnik, Korlino, Królewice, Królewko, Królewo, Łącko, Łężek, Marszewo, Masłowice, Mazów, Mszane, Mszanka, Naćmierz, Nosalin, Nosalinek, Nowe Łącko, Pałówko, Pałowo, Pieńkówko, Pieńkowo, Pieszcz, Postomino, Przybudówka-Królewo, Radziszkowo, Ronino, Rusinowo, Staniewice, Tłuki, Tyń, Wicko Morskie, Wilkowice, Wszedzień, Wykroty and Złakowo.

Neighbouring gminas
Gmina Postomino is bordered by the gminas of Darłowo, Kobylnica, Sławno, Słupsk and Ustka.

References
Polish official population figures 2006

Postomino
Sławno County

de:Postomino#Gmina Postomino